Bethan "Beth" Morris (19 July 1943 – 1 March 2018) was a Welsh actress.

Born in Gorseinon and a lifetime native of Swansea, she was probably best known for her performance as Julia Drusilla in the 1976 BBC adaptation of I, Claudius. Her career spanned from 1969 to 2004 and other notable TV credits include: Softly, Softly, Dixon of Dock Green, David Copperfield, Blake's 7, Minder, The District Nurse and Time Trumpet.

Among her stage roles, she appeared in Bertolt Brecht's Edward II at the Round House Theatre in London.

Personal life
Bethan Morris was born in 1943 to Charles Emlyn Morris (1915–83) and Gwendoline Lillias (John) Morris (1915–2011). She married actor Stephen Moore in the Borough of Lewisham, London in 1974. After they divorced in 1986, she was a partner of actor Bill Nighy. She lived in Y Garn, Penllergaer, and was found dead in her home on St David's Day at the age of 74.

Selected filmography
 Crucible of Terror (1971)
 That'll Be the Day (1973)
 Tales That Witness Madness (1973)
 Son of Dracula (1974)

Selected television roles

References

External links
 

1943 births
2018 deaths
Actresses from Swansea
Welsh film actresses
Welsh stage actresses
Welsh television actresses
20th-century Welsh actresses
21st-century Welsh actresses
People from Gorseinon
20th-century British businesspeople